The Indian Institute of Management Bodh Gaya (IIM-BG) is an autonomous public business school in Bodh Gaya, Bihar in India. It is the 16th Indian Institute of Management (IIM). The institution was mentored by Indian Institute of Management Calcutta.

History 

Originally named IIM Bihar, IIM-BG was one of five Indian Institutes of Management (IIMs) set up by the 2014 Union budget of India. The academic session for the first batch was inaugurated by HRD Minister, Smriti Irani on 31 August 2015.

In 2018, Dr. Vinita S. Sahay, professor of marketing at the Indian Institute of Management Raipur, was appointed by the Government of India as the first director of IIM Bodh Gaya. Dr. Vinita S. Sahay is only the second woman in the country to lead an IIM. Top leaders and industrialists like Uday Kotak (Chairperson & MD & CEO, Kotak Bank Ltd.), Falguni S. Nayar (Founder & CEO, Nykaa.com) and many other eminent personalities constitute the  Board of Governors of IIM Bodh Gaya.

Campus

IIM Bodh Gaya is located in the temple city of Bodh Gaya, the most sacred pilgrimage site for Buddhists. Bodh Gaya was once the centre of learning in the known world and students came from as far as Central Asia, Mongolia, Korea, China, Afghanistan and Iran to learn not only Buddhism but science, mathematics, administration etc. The institute moved to its transit campus, which has all the facilities, in July 2019. It has its own hostels, Aryabhatta and Bhaskara with all necessary amenities for different sports like cricket, volleyball, football, table-tennis, basketball, badminton, etc. and a fully equipped gymnasium.

Academics

Academic programmes
The Post Graduate Programme in Management (PGPM) is a two-year, regular, full-time residential program. Admission to the PGP course of IIM Bodh Gaya is conducted each year through the Common Admission Test (CAT). The PGP course consists of six trimesters spread over the two years. The first year constitutes the fundamental courses which lay the premises for various management roles. Between the first and second years, students are expected to go through an eight-week summer internship. The second-year constitutes the elective courses that provide diverse opportunities for students to study and specialize in their specific fields of interest.

IIM Bodh Gaya follows the same pedagogy of its previous mentor, the Indian Institute of Management Calcutta.

Student Exchange Program

IIM Bodh Gaya is one of the top B-schools in India and has further strengthened its position by meaningful and mutually beneficial collaborations with different esteemed institutions around the globe. This step will two year PGP flagship program students towards a broader and better view of strategic development in the global era by responding effectively to rapid changes in the social, economic, legal, technological, cultural, and political environments. IIM Bodh Gaya has collaborated with ESC Clermont Graduate School of Management (France), Montpellier Business School (France), Alba Graduate Business School (Greece), SolBridge International School of Business (South Korea), Instituto de Estudios Superiores de Administración (Venezuela), the University of Florence (Italy), Universidad De Monterrey (UDEM, Mexico), and few more under process.

Student life
IIM Bodh Gaya's committees include Envision-Cell a center for industrial relations & entrepreneurship development, Cultural committee Media & PR committee, Academic committee, IT committee, PGP committee, Alumni committee, social responsibility committee Pragati, Communicacion a communication club, sports club, finance club FINix, marketing club MaSq, Strategy, and Consulting club and operations club OPSIM.

Events

Throughout the year there are several events organized in the campus like futsal, cricket or table tennis tournaments by Sports Club, Village adoption program and other social drives by Pragati, the CSR Club of IIM Bodh Gaya, different festivals like Onam, Christmas, Ganesh Puja, etc. by the Cultural Committee, Youth Entrepreneurship Summit by E-Cell, Annual Leadership Summit Netritva by Media & PR Cell, HR conclave Gyanodyaya by Placement Committee and last but not the least Elegante, flagship annual event of IIM Bodh Gaya organized in collaboration with all the committees and clubs.

Fit India Movement

Initiated by our Honorable PM of India Mr. Narendra Modi, a blood donation camp was organized by the Pragati Club of IIM Bodh Gaya in association with Magadh Medical College, Gaya. More than 100 members including students and faculty donated blood to support the noble cause along with 5 km marathon for creating awareness by showing a great deal of enthusiasm for the greater good.

Elegante

Started in the year 2016, Elegante is the annual management, sports, and cultural fest of IIM Bodh Gaya organized by the cultural committee in coordination with all the other clubs and committees. It is a two-day event filled with excitement, entertainment, and enjoyment from management quizzes and case study competitions to sports competitions to cultural events and fashion shows.

Netritva

IIM Bodh Gaya organized its maiden leadership summit Netritva in 2019. It hosted personalities like Rajeev Bhaduria (Managing Partner- Ebullient), Rakesh Singhania (CFO- Wellsfargo), Gaurav Sangtani (President - Jigyasa Foundation), Amita Karadkhedkar (VP- Citi) and several other top industrialists and leaders.

ज्ञानोदय (Gyanodaya)

Started in the year 2018, Gyanodaya is the annual HR conclave of IIM Bodh Gaya. It provides a platform where corporate leaders share their valuable thoughts and changing economic constraints with the students. The theme for the 2019 conclave was "Changing HR trends in the modern world" which witnessed the presence of eminent and distinguished HRs and leaders from the corporate world.

Rankings 

IIM Bodhgaya was ranked 73rd among business/management schools in India by  National Institutional Ranking Framework (NIRF) in 2022.

References

IIM Bodhgaya Launches MBA Programmes in Hospital and Healthcare Management and Digital Business Management  2023 

Business schools in Bihar
 
Colleges in India
Gaya district
Educational institutions established in 2015
2015 establishments in Bihar